Franco Uncini (born 9 March 1955) is an Italian former professional Grand Prix motorcycle road racing. He was 1982 FIM Road Racing World Champion with Suzuki. He was inducted into the F.I.M. MotoGP Hall of Fame in 2016.


Career
Uncini was born at Recanati, province of Macerata. He made his debut as professional motorcycle road racer in the 750cc class with Laverda, moving later to Ducati, with whom he earned various titles as Italian champion. His first year in the Grand Prix World Championship was with Yamaha in 1976, in both the 250cc and the 350cc classes. The following year he continued to race in both classes, this time with the Harley-Davidson team, winning two Grands Prix in 250cc (Grand Prix of Nations and Czechoslovakia) and finishing second in championship behind Mario Lega. However, his quarrelsome relationship with teammate Walter Villa forced him to move back to Yamaha.

After some disappointing years with a privateer Yamaha team, in 1979 he purchased a Suzuki RG500 and launched a private team of his own in the 500cc class. He was the top-ranking privateer both in 1979 and 1980, with 5th- and 4th-place finishes. Accidents hindered his 1981 season, but after Marco Lucchinelli left Suzuki to join Honda, Suzuki offered Uncini an official factory-sponsored race bike run by Roberto Gallina's team. Finally, with a competitive vehicle, Uncini won the World Championship in 1982, scoring five victories (GPs of Austria, Netherlands, Yugoslavia, Great Britain and GP of Nations). He was the last Italian rider to win the 500cc crown until Valentino Rossi won in 2001, and for almost two decades the last European rider to win 500cc before Alex Criville won his title in 1999.

In 1983, he was severely injured at TT-Assen (The Netherlands), when he fell off his bike and was struck in the head by competitor Wayne Gardner's bike. He went into a coma, but eventually recovered. He retired from motorcycle competition after the 1985  season.

Today, Uncini acts as Fédération Internationale de Motocyclisme Safety Officer in MotoGP.

Career statistics
Grand Prix motorcycle racing results 

Points system from 1969 to 1988:

(key) (Races in bold indicate pole position; races in italics indicate fastest lap)

References

1955 births
Living people
People from Recanati
People from Civitanova Marche
Italian motorcycle racers
250cc World Championship riders
350cc World Championship riders
500cc World Championship riders
Sportspeople from the Province of Macerata
500cc World Riders' Champions